Diego Gutiérrez Chávez (born October 24, 1993) is a Mexican born soccer player who plays as a defender and defensive midfielder for Colorado Springs Switchbacks FC in the United Soccer League.

Early life and education 
Diego was born in Leon, Guanajuato, Mexico but moved to the United States at the age of 12. He attended Frisco Centennial High School and played collegiate Division 1 soccer for Houston Baptist University.

Professional career 
Gutierrez signed for his hometown club Club León in December 2015. After a 6-month spell, he transferred to Inter Playa del Carmen where he also spent 6 months. In early 2017, he signed a two-year contract for the Colorado Springs Switchbacks FC.

Notes

1993 births
Living people
Mexican footballers
Sportspeople from León, Guanajuato
Footballers from Guanajuato
Association footballers not categorized by position